Glomfjord power plant is a hydroelectric power plant in the village of Glomfjord in the municipality of Meløy in Nordland county, Norway. The plant also house a newer 2.4WM Francis generator taking water from Fykanvatn lake as well. The outlet of the plant is the Glomfjorden and then the Norwegian Sea.

The plant is currently owned by Statkraft.

History
The power plant was built in 1920 to a design by the architect Olaf Nordhagen. It opened with two Pelton turbines at 20MW each delivering power at 25Hz. In 1922 a third one was opened. At the time these were the largest turbines in operation in Norway.
During the Second World War the Germans started expanding with three additional turbines, but in 1942 an Anglo-Norwegian raid, Operation Musketoon, attacked the German-held power plant. The plant slowly got back into operation, but the tree generators were never completed by the end of the war. They were completed between 1948 and 1949. At this time it reached its peak of 120MW from 6 equal Pelton turbines, which lasted until Svartisen power plant was completed in 1993.
Because Svartisen used most of the water, Glomfjord was scaled back and only generator 3 was being used. It was also converted to 50Hz operation and connected to the main power grid.
Today only generators 1-3 remains with 3# in normal operation. 4-6 were removed around 2012 to make room for a 2.4MW Francis turbine using water from Fykanvann that opened in 2013.

References
 https://www.nve.no/vann-vassdrag-og-miljo/nves-utvalgte-kulturminner/kraftverk/glomfjord/
 http://www.statkraft.com
 Arkitekturguide for Nord-Norge og Svalbard
 Konsesjonssøknad - Fykanvannet kraftverk

Meløy
Hydroelectric power stations in Norway
Buildings and structures in Nordland
Energy infrastructure completed in 1918
1918 establishments in Norway